The 6th Platino Awards was presented at Gran Tlachco Theater in Riviera Maya, Mexico on May 12, 2019, to honour the best in Ibero-American films of 2018. The ceremony was televised in Latin America by TNT, and hosted by Cecilia Suárez and Santiago Segura.

Roma received the most nominations with nine, and the most awards with five.

Performers

Winners and nominees

Honorary Platino
 Raphael

References

External links
 Official site

6
Platino
2019 in Mexico